The Hall Ministry was a responsible government in New Zealand, sometimes referred to as part of the Continuous Ministry. It took office after defeating Sir George Grey's supporters (many of whom would subsequently form the Liberal Party) in a confidence motion, and is usually regarded as a conservative Ministry, although Hall himself described his followers as "the independent Liberal party".

Background
Sir William Fox acted as leader of the opposition to Grey and moved a no-confidence motion against him which precipitated the 1879 general election; however, Fox lost his seat in that election, leaving Hall in charge by default. Hall moved his own confidence motion when the House met, and won by two votes on account of the Government's "extravagance" on the civil service and a new £5 million loan. Almost immediately, the Hall Ministry was challenged when James Macandrew and others returned to Grey's party and moved a fresh confidence motion against Hall. However, the new Ministry survived by signing a formal deal with the so-called 'Auckland Rats', who shifted to support Hall in return for a promise to maintain public works spending in the North Island. Contemporaries argued that "it was fear of Grey alone" which prevented wavering Members from voting down the Hall Government.

The Ministry's main goal was retrenchment amid the long economic depression of the 1880s: Treasurer Harry Atkinson introduced a property tax and increased customs duties while reducing public spending on elements of the Public Works programme such as government-assisted passages for male immigrants. Rather than continue with big infrastructure projects, Hall's Ministry focused on smaller projects spread throughout the country as a means of attracting the support of the widest possible number of Members, and then attempted to de-politicise railway construction by creating a separate Board of Public Works. Atkisnon was able to announce a Budget surplus in 1881.

Although Hall preferred to govern by means of Cabinet consensus, the Ministry was divided on Māori policy. Henare Tomoana, appointed Minister without portfolio representing the Native Race, understood that he was to have greater influence over this, and was disappointed by Native Minister John Bryce's announcement of his own policy. He resigned after being in office for a fortnight. Bryce favoured the forcible confiscation of Taranaki land occupied by Te Whiti, and was forced to resign in William Rolleston's favour when he didn't get the backing of Cabinet on this aggressive approach. Rolleston, however, was unable to convince Te Whiti to accept his proposed Native Reserves, and Bryce was brought back to lead the armed march on Te Whiti's passive-resister community at Parihaka.

Reforms passed by this Ministry included the Triennial Parliaments Act and the introduction of universal manhood suffrage. However, in April 1882 Hall resigned on the advice of his doctors, advising Governor Gordon to call Whitaker to continue the government. However, as Hall was at that moment in conflict with Bryce, Gordon instead attempted to call Sir George Grey back to office and had to be reminded that Hall's supporters still had a parliamentary majority.

Ministers
The following members served in the Hall Ministry:

See also
 New Zealand Government

Notes

References

Ministries of Queen Victoria
Governments of New Zealand
1879 establishments in New Zealand
Hall Ministry
Hall Ministry